The Tsentralno–Zavodska line is the first and only line of the Dnipro Metro in Dnipro, located in east Ukraine. The line's short length, makes the Dnipro Metro system the shortest metro system in the world. Only the system's depot, Diivka, is located west of Pokrovska station.

History
Construction of these stations was restarted in late February 2011 after being completely halted on 26 July 2009. The stations were expected to be finished by late 2015, but construction was stopped because the tender to select the contractor was stopped by the city council in August 2015. In November 2018, city authorities expected the three stations to be opened by the summer of 2023. In December 2020 they downgraded that prediction to 2024. After the completion of these three stations the line would finally be as it was envisioned in 1980 (by the planning of the Soviet Union). The extension will increase the number of stations to nine, which would extend the line 4 km to a total of 11.8 km (7.3 mile).

There are plans (all the following mentioned expansion of the line were not envisioned in the 1980s vision of the line) for two other station, "Parus" planned for the western terminus of the Tsentralno–Zavodska line, and "Dnipro" as the terminus following "Muzeina". In 2011, there were also plans for another new station following "Parus", a station called "Parus-2" or "Dyivska". Partly, a lack of funding for the construction predetermined that the city then named Dnipropetrovsk was not chosen as one of the host cities of the UEFA Euro 2012 football championship.

Notes

References

Dnipro Metro
Rapid transit lines in Ukraine
Railway lines opened in 1995
1995 establishments in Ukraine